The zombie comedy, often called zom com or zomedy, is a film genre that aims to blend zombie horror motifs with slapstick comedy as well as morbid humor.

History

The earliest roots of the genre can be found in Jean Yarbrough's King of the Zombies (1941) and Gordon Douglas's Zombies on Broadway (1945), though both of these films dealt with Haitian-style zombies. While not comedies, George A. Romero's Dawn of the Dead (1978) and Day of the Dead (1985) featured several comedic scenes and satirical commentary on society. An American Werewolf in London (1981) and the Return of the Living Dead series (1985) (especially the first two and the last of the series) can be considered some of the earliest examples of zombie-comedy using the modern zombie. Other early examples include Mr. Vampire, CHUD II: Bud the CHUD (1989), Braindead (1992), and Bio Zombie (1998).

A popular modern zombie comedy is Edgar Wright's Shaun of the Dead (2004), a self-dubbed romantic zombie comedy, or RomZomCom, with many in-jokes and references to George A. Romero's earlier Dead films, especially Dawn of the Dead. Other popular zombie comedies include Gregg Bishop's Dance of the Dead (2008) and the 2009 film Zombieland.

Andrew Currie's Fido, Matthew Leutwyler's Dead & Breakfast, and Peter Jackson's Braindead are also examples of zombie comedies. Sam Raimi's Evil Dead II, although a more direct horror film, contains some lighthearted and dark comedy elements, and its sequel, Army of Darkness, is even more comedic. The Evil Dead series does not, however, feature any traditional-style zombies.

List
Films that can be considered zombie comedies include:

 Mr. Vampire (1985)
 Re-Animator (1985)
 Return of the Living Dead (1985)
 Redneck Zombies (1986)
 Night of the Creeps (1986)
 Dead Heat (1988)
 Army of Darkness (1992)
 My Boyfriend's Back (1993)
 Bio Zombie (1998)
 Idle Hands (1999), starring Devon Sawa and Seth Green
 Stacy: Attack of the Schoolgirl Zombies (2001)
 Shaun of the Dead (2004)
 Poultrygeist: Night of the Chicken Dead (2005)
 Tokyo Zombie (2005)
 Fido (2006)
 Dance of the Dead (2008)
 Zombie Strippers (2008)
 Dead Snow (2009)
 Zombieland (2009), starring Woody Harrelson, Jesse Eisenberg, Emma Stone and Abigail Breslin
 Juan De Los Muertos (2010), Spanish-Cuban film released in the UK and US as Juan of the Dead
 DeadHeads (2011)
 Cockneys vs Zombies (2012)
 ParaNorman (2012)
 Buck Wild (2013) 
 Warm Bodies (2013)
 Go Goa Gone(2013), Indian Film
 Zombie eXs (2013)
 Burying the Ex (2014)
 Dead Snow 2: Red vs. Dead (2014), Icelandic-Norwegian
 Life After Beth (2014)
 Scouts Guide to the Zombie Apocalypse (2015)
 Night of the Living Deb (2015)
 Pride and Prejudice and Zombies (2016)
 One Cut of the Dead (2017), a low-budget Japanese film
 Trip Ubusan: The Lolas vs. Zombies (2017)
 The Dead Don't Die (2019)
 The Odd Family: Zombie On Sale (2019), a first South Korean zombie comedy film.
 Zomboat! (2019), ITV/Hulu TV show
 Zombieland: Double Tap (2019), sequel to Zombieland
 Little Monsters (the 2019 Hulu Original, not to be confused with the 1989 comedy film starring Fred Savage and Howie Mandel of the same name)Zombie Reddy (2021)Aquarium of the Dead (2021)Zombivli'' (2022)

See also
 Cannibalism in popular culture
 Comedy horror
 List of comedy horror films
 Zombies in popular culture

References

Film genres
Comedy genres
Horror genres
Horror comedy